The Polesian Lowland is a lowland in the southwestern portion of the East European Plain in the drainage basins of several rivers including the Dnieper, Pripyat and Desna. It stretches along the Belarus–Ukraine border. The eastern part of the lowland extends into Bryansk Oblast in the Russian Federation.

The Polesian Lowland is characterised by predominance of sandy lowlands with large, mostly swampy valleys.

See also
 Polesia

References

East European Plain
Plains of Belarus
Plains of Poland
Plains of Russia
Plains of Ukraine